Abdelhadi Boutaleb (23 December 1923 in Fes – 16 December 2009 in Rabat) was a Moroccan prolific historian and author, and a politician. He held many ministerial posts in the 1960s and 1970s and was an ambassador of Morocco to Syria, Mexico and the United States. He is also a founding member (alongsideMehdi Ben Barka) of the National Union of Popular Forces (UNFP) in 1959, the main Moroccan left-wing political party. He later became a councilor to king Hassan II before retiring political life. He was an alumnus of Al-Qarawiyin.

References
http://abdelhadiboutaleb.com/biographie_fr.asp

External links
Official website

Moroccan politicians
People from Fez, Morocco
Member of the Academy of the Kingdom of Morocco
Moroccan writers
Ambassadors of Morocco to the United States
Ambassadors of Morocco to Syria
Ambassadors of Morocco to Mexico
Presidents of the House of Representatives (Morocco)
1923 births
2009 deaths
Advisors to Hassan II of Morocco
University of al-Qarawiyyin alumni